The 49th Guillermo Mendoza Memorial Scholarship Foundation Box Office Entertainment Awards (GMMSF-BOEA) was an awarding ceremony honoring the actors, actresses, showbiz personalities, movies and TV programs in the Philippines. It was held on May 20, 2018 at the Newport Performing Arts Theater, Resorts World Manila, Pasay. The awards night was hosted by ABS-CBN personalities Enchong Dee, Robi Domingo, Arci Muñoz, Xian Lim, Yassi Pressman, and Iza Calzado. The awards night will be shown on ABS-CBN's "Sunday's Best" on May 27, 2018.

Winners selection
The GMMSF honors Filipino actors, actresses and other performers' commercial success, regardless of artistic merit, in the Philippine entertainment industry. The award giving body selects the high-ranking Philippine films of 2017 based on total average rankings at box office published results as basis for awarding the three major categories in the awarding ceremonies, The Phenomenal Box Office Star, The Box Office King and The Box Office Queen.

Winners

Film

Television

Music

Special Awards

References

Box Office Entertainment Awards
2018 film awards
2018 television awards
2018 music awards